Clubiona mykolai is a sac spider species found in Ukraine.

See also 
 List of Clubionidae species

References

External links 

Clubionidae
Fauna of Ukraine
Spiders of Europe
Spiders described in 2003